The 2020–21 Colgate Raiders women's ice hockey season represented Colgate University in the 2020–21 NCAA Division I women's ice hockey season. They were coached by Greg Fargo, in his ninth season, and played their home games at Class of 1965 Arena.

Colgate defeated St. Lawrence 3–2 in the ECAC Championship Game, winning their first championship in program history. They automatically qualified for the 2021 NCAA National Collegiate Women's Ice Hockey Tournament, where the Raiders were ranked as the #4 seed. They lost to Minnesota Duluth 0–1 in overtime in the national quarterfinals.

Offseason

Recruiting

Regular season
Sammy Smigliani logged a goal and assist in a 3-2 ECAC Tournament Final versus St. Lawrence, earning the ECAC Tournament Most Outstanding Player Award. Having also recorded a goal in the ECAC semifinals victory versus Quinnipiac, she won a team-high 72.7 percent of her faceoffs, helping Colgate to win 61.2 percent of their overall faceoffs versus St. Lawrence.

Standings

Schedule
Source:

|-
!colspan=12 style="  "| Regular Season

|-
!colspan=12 style="  "| Playoffs
|-

|-
!colspan=12 style="  "| NCAA Tournament
|-

Roster

2020–21 Raiders

Awards and honors

References

Colgate Raiders
2020-21 Colgate Raiders women's ice hockey season